Lee Hunt may refer to:

Lee Hunt (footballer), in 2007–08 UEFA Cup qualifying rounds
Lee Hunt (basketball), player in 1981–82 NCAA Division I men's basketball season

See also

Leigh Hunt (disambiguation)